DT2 may refer to:
Dead Trigger 2, a video game
HHA Type DT2, a two-car electric multiple unit train
Donald Trump, Jr.
Cashew MRT station, Singapore